Saint Paul's Episcopal Church is a historic Episcopal church located at Watertown in Jefferson County, New York. The church was built in 1889-1891 and is Romanesque Revival–style edifice.  It is a one-storey, asymmetrically massed building of random course ashlar stone of light grey color.  It features a three-story square stone tower with a crenellated top and round battlements at the corners and square ones in the center.

It was listed on the National Register of Historic Places in 1997.

References

Churches on the National Register of Historic Places in New York (state)
Episcopal church buildings in New York (state)
Churches completed in 1891
19th-century Episcopal church buildings
Churches in Watertown, New York
National Register of Historic Places in Watertown, New York